Mount Holdsworth is a granite peak,  high, in the eastern part of the Monteath Hills, in the Victory Mountains of Victoria Land, Antarctica. It was named by the New Zealand Federated Mountain Clubs Antarctic Expedition, 1962–63, after Gerald Holdsworth, the leader of the northern party of this expedition.

References

Mountains of Victoria Land
Borchgrevink Coast